The Xiaoyao Faction or Xiaoyao Pai, also known as Tea-drinking Faction (喝茶派),  translated into English as Wanderers' Faction or Faction of Bystanders or Carefree Clique, refers to the illiterate or indifferent people who do not belong to any mass organization, who do not engage in any factional struggle, and who stay away from radical movements,  during the Cultural Revolution. It included some cadres of the Chinese Communist Party,  and some less active Red Guards. 

The term "xiaoyao" comes from Zhuangzi, and its original meaning in the phrase "xiaoyao pai" means having no conflicts with the world and being at ease. "Xiaoyao Pai" became a special term during the Cultural Revolution. They were spectators of the Cultural Revolution. At the beginning of the Cultural Revolution, there were very few members of the Xiaoyao Faction, but as the movement progressed, its members gradually expanded.

The Xiaoyao Faction was used as a term of criticism at the time. It was considered a derogatory term, and members of the so-called Xiaoyao Faction were seen as dishonorable. However, since the Xiaoyao Faction was a group of "cold-eyed spectators" during the Cultural Revolution, they could obtain rational thinking and political wisdom that the "Rebel Faction" (造反派) could not. Because of this, a new group of independent spiritual bearers emerged from the original "Xiaoyao Faction".

Notable representatives of the Xiaoyao Faction included Li Yuanchao, Li Zehou, Yan Jiaqi, Liu Zaifu, Fang Lizhi, and Xu Liangying.

See also 
 Red Guards
 Cultural Revolution

References 

Red Guards
Cultural Revolution
People's Republic of China